Emily Shaw or Emily Alice Shaw is a Canadian luthier, classical guitarist and teacher from Ottawa, Ontario. As a luthier, she builds classical guitars, baroque guitars ukuleles and similar instruments.

References

Canadian luthiers
Canadian classical guitarists
Canadian women guitarists
Canadian musical instrument makers
Living people
21st-century Canadian guitarists
21st-century Canadian women musicians
Musicians from Ottawa
Year of birth missing (living people)
21st-century women guitarists